Gervacio Santos is a Filipino film editor. During his career, he was considered one of the most demanded in his field. Gervacio has worked under numerous pseudonyms including: George Santos, Gerry Santos, Herb Bas, Bas Santos, and Bass Santos.  He has earned numerous awards, including three Famas Awards for Kalibre 45 (1957), Cavalry Command (1963) and Scout Rangers (1964). He won Best Film Editing Awards in both the Metro Manila Film Festival for "Remembrance" and in the Quezon City Film Festival for "Alyas Bagsik".

Career 
Santos began his professional career as an editor in 1954 at Premiere Productions where he was given the break to edit the film titled Conde de Monte Carlo starring Roegilio de la Rosa. He worked on Si Eva at si Adan directed by Gerry de Leon. As house Editors he edited an average of one feature film monthly, editing pictures directed by prominent movie directors including to name a few, Nemesio Caravana, Cesar Gallardo, Efren Reyes, Bert Avellana, Eddie Romero,Teodorico Santos, Eddie Infante, Josefino Cenizal, others. In 1967, he left the studio and became employed by Tamaraw Studios, owned and operated by Albert Joseph and his brothers. The studio have editing and laboratory facilities which cater to independent film productions including Tagalog Ilang Ilang Productions, AM (Amalia Fuentes) Productions, JE (Joseph Estrada) Productions among others. 
As a freelancer, he worked in every studio facilities such as LVN Studios, Sampaguita Pictures, FIL-AM (Fernando Poe Productions) where other movie producers have their production filmed and processed for post-production. By this time, Santos had edited several hundred full-length Filipino movies. Having established a good refutation American producers who came to shoot their movies in the Philippines hired him to edit their film. It is at this time that he shifted his attention to editing American movies, mostly with Roger Corman who co-produce with Cirio Santiago Film Organization. (IMDb has a partial list of the several movies he had edited for them.

He served as president of the Film Editors Guild of the Philippines from 1974 to 1983 and then again in 1984 to 1986 at the same times being a member of the board of governors of the Film Academy of the Philippines.
 Gervacio has worked under numerous pseudonyms including: George Santos, Gerry Santos, Herb Bas, Bas Santos, and Bass Santos. He has earned numerous awards, including three Famas Awards for Kalibre 45 (1957), Cavalry Command (1963) and Scout Rangers (1964). He won Best Film Editing Awards in both the Metro Manila Film Festival for "Remembrance" and in the Quezon City Film Festival for "Alyas Bagsik".
ACHIEVEMENTS:
Been Former President of the FILM EDITORS GUILD
Become a member of the Board of Governors of the FILM ACADEMY OF THE PHILIPPINES 
Been Lay Minister in Our Lady of Grace Parish Church and elected Education Chairman
Been Chairman of the Seminar in MARIOLOGY
Member KNIGHTS OF COLUMBUS 4th Degree 
Been President of Grace Park TOASTMASTER CLUB and received a trophy for becoming Champion in Extemporaneous Speech in an Area Competition 
Been elected Number One Councillor of his Barangay in 1998 
In 1989, although he has an assignment with Cirio Santiago to edit 2 films, he, together with his family emigrated to Toronto, Ontario, Canada. He planned to come back to the country to fulfill the assignments but for some reason he had not made it. He and his family members are now full-pledged Canadian citizens.

Present career 
Santos is currently retired. He lives in Canada with his wife, five children, and six grandchildren. 
Circa 2012–21, Santos has been involved in the Toronto television show Fillipino, Eh! where he appeared in various comedy skits.

Filmography 
 Dune Warriors (1990)
 Demon of Paradise (1987)
 The Fighter (1987) (as Bass Santos)
 a.k.a. The Kick Fighter
 Eye of the Eagle (1986)
 Future Hunters (1986)
 a.k.a. Deadly Quest
 a.k.a. Spear of Destiny 
 The Devastator (1985)
 a.k.a. Kings Ransom
 a.k.a. The Destroyers
 Final Mission (1984)
 a.k.a. Last Mission
 Wheels of Fire (1984)
 a.k.a. Desert Warrior
 a.k.a. Pyro 
 a.k.a. Vindicator
 Stryker (1983)
 Get My Son Dead or Alive (1982)
 a.k.a. Savage Dawn (video title)
 Firecracker (1981)
 a.k.a. Naked Fist
 Up from the Depths (1979)
 Death Force (1978)
 a.k.a. Fierce
 a.k.a. Fighting Mad
 Hell Hole (1978)
 a.k.a. Escape from Women's Hell Hole (USA: video title)
 a.k.a. Women of Hell's Island (video title)
 The Muthers (1976)
 She Devils in Chains (1976)
 a.k.a. American Beauty Hostages
 a.k.a. Ebony, Ivory, and Jade
 a.k.a. Foxfire
 a.k.a. Foxforce
 Cover Girl Models (1975)
 Supercock (1975)
 a.k.a. A Fistful of Feathers (USA)
 a.k.a. Fowl Play
 a.k.a. Superchicken
 TNT Jackson (1975)
 Bamboo Gods and Iron Men (1974)
 a.k.a. Black Kung Fu (USA: video title)
 Fly Me (1973) (as George Santos)
 Scout Ranger (1964)
 Cavalry Command (1963)
 a.k.a. The Day of the Trumpet
 Terror Is a Man (1959)
x Movini's Venom (1970)
 a.k.a. Blood Creature (USA: reissue title)
 a.k.a. Creature from Blood Island
 a.k.a. The Gory Creatures
 The Scavengers (1959)
 Kalibre .45 (1957)

External links
 

Filipino film editors
Year of birth missing (living people)
Living people
Filipino emigrants to Canada
Filipino expatriates in Canada